Fujiwara no Taishi (藤原 帯子, also read Fujiwara no Tarashiko; died 794) was a Japanese noblewoman of the Nara period. She was a consort of Prince Ate. She had no children with him, but more than a decade after her death she was granted the title of empress on her husband's becoming Emperor Heizei.

Biography 
Fujiwara no Taishi's year of birth is unknown. Her father was Fujiwara no Momokawa. At some point she married Prince Ate (773–824), but died suddenly of an illness in Enryaku 13 (794). She was posthumously granted the title of empress (kōgō) upon the accession of her husband to the throne in Daidō 1 (806).

References

Citations

Works cited 

 

Fujiwara clan
Japanese posthumous empresses
Year of birth unknown
794 deaths